Podgora pri Ložu is a village south of Stari Trg in the Municipality of Loška Dolina in the Inner Carniola region of Slovenia.

Name
The name of the settlement was changed from Podgora to Podgora pri Ložu in 1955.

Cultural heritage
There is a small chapel in the settlement dedicated to the Holy Family. It was built in 1996 and belongs to the Parish of Stari Trg.

References

External links
Podgora pri Ložu on Geopedia

Populated places in the Municipality of Loška Dolina